Everett-Pacific Shipbuilding & Dry Dock Company was established in 1942 to build ships needed for World War II. Yard construction began on 1 March 1942. As part of the Emergency Shipbuilding Program the US Navy provided some of the capital to start Everett-Pacific Shipbuilding at Port Gardner Bay in Everett, Washington. Everett-Pacific was sold in 1945 to the Pacific Car and Foundry, who was already a major manufacturer of railcars and trucks. Pacific Car and Foundry was building barges for the US Navy during World War II at plants in Renton, Seattle and Tacoma in the state of Washington. The lease for the shipyard in Everett, Washington ended in 1949 and the yard closed. Pacific Car and Foundry in 1972 changed its name to Paccar Inc. to reflect its major products. The Everett-Pacific shipyard site later became part of Western Gear, a heavy machinery manufacturer. in 1987 the shipyard became part of Naval Station Everett. Everett-Pacific Shipbuilding was started by William Pigott Jr. a Seattle businessmen and his brother Paul Pigott (1900-1961).  William Pigott Jr. was born in 26 Aug. 1895 in Pueblo, CO and died on 8 July 1947 in San Francisco, CA.

Some of the ships built by Everett-Pacific

Large Auxiliary Floating Dry Docks (AFDB) 

Auxiliary Floating Dock, Big, came in sections that are 3,850 tons and are 93 feet long each. Each Section had a 165 feet beam, a 75 feet molded depth and had 10,000 tons lifting capacity each. They are also known as Advance Base Sectional Docks (ABSD). Sections could be put together to lift larger ships. AFDB were needed to repair battleships, aircraft carriers, cruisers, and large auxiliary ships. AFDB-1 Artisan had 10 sections (A to J) for a total lift of 100,000 tons and was 1,000 feet long with all 10 sections installed. AFDB-1 to 7 were built between 1943 and 1945 and then towed to remote navy bases. An AFDB would have a crew of 600 to 1000 men, have a fresh-water distilling plant and be self-sustaining. They had a rail traveling 15-ton capacity crane with an 85-foot radius and two or more support barges.  To pump out the water in the tanks there were two 24-inch discharge pumps on each section, each pump rated 15,000 gpm. For power there were two 350-kw diesel AC generators on each section, producing 440 volts 3-phase 60-cycle power.  Had steam plants to run the pumps. Each section could store 65,000 gal. of fuel oil, this was to supply the ships under repair. For the crew to live next to the AFDB the Navy had barracks ships called APL, that dock next to the AFDB.
USS Artisan (ABSD-1) (A-J)

Medium Auxiliary Floating Dry Docks (AFDM)
 
Everett-Pacific's AFDM are 8,000 tons and 622 feet long. AFDM has crew of 140 to 200 men. AFDM had a lift capacity 18,000 tons and armed with two 40mm and four 20mm guns. Had two -ton cranes with 16 ballast tank compartments. AFDM were built in three pieces, a long center section and two shorter sections at each end. All AFDM had Yard Floating Docks (YFD) class numbers also.
 USS Resourceful (AFDM-5)  Everett-Pacific, YFD 21, sold private in 1999
 USS Competent (AFDM-6) Everett-Pacific, YFD 62, sold private in 1997
 USS Sustain (AFDM-7) Everett-Pacific, YFD 63, leased to BAE Jacksonville in 1997

Net layer ships 

Net laying ships that were 1,100 tons and 194 feet long. A net layer's primary function was to lay and maintain steel anti-torpedo or anti-submarine nets. Nets could be laid around an individual ship at anchor, or around harbors or other anchorages.  As World War II progressed, net layers were pressed into a variety of additional roles including salvage, troop and cargo transport, buoy maintenance, and service as tugboats.
Ship  -Delivery date                  
USS Ailanthus (YN 57) - 2-Dec-1943 - Later AN 38, wrecked off Alaska 1944 
USS Bitterbush (YN 58) - 15-Jan-1944 - Later AN 39, sold 1948, destroyed 1954
USS Anaqua (YN 59) - 21-Feb-1944 - Later a 40, sold 1946
USS Baretta (YN 60) - 18-Mar-1944 - Later a 41, sold 1947
USS Cliffrose (YN 61) - 30-Apr-1944 - Later a 42, to China 1947, discarded
USS Satinleaf (YN 62) - 8-Apr-1944 - Later a 43, sold 1947
USS Corkwood (YN 63) - 16-May-1944 - Later a 44, sold 1947
USS Cornel (YN 64) - 6-Jun-1944 - Later a 45, sold 1947
USS Mastic (YN 65) - 4-Jul-1944 - Later a 46, sold 1947
USS Canotia (YN 66) - 30-Jul-1944 - Later a 47, sold 1947

Tugboats
US Navy small tugboats that were 70 tons and 66 feet long. US Navy Class District Harbor Tug. Small. Has a beam of 17 feet, draft of 4' 11", crew of 4. Propulsion was a diesel engine with a single screw and 300shp.
YTL 422 - 21-Aug- 1944 - Sold 1986 as Spike
YTL 423 - 2-Sep- 1944 - To Vietnam 1963
YTL 424 - 9-Sep- 1944 - Sold 1972 as Tussler
YTL 425 - 15-Sep- 1944 - To the Philippines 1971
YTL 426 - 25-Sep- 1944 - To Argentina 1969
YTL 427 - 28-Sep- 1944 - To Taiwan 1963
YTL 428 - 11-Oct- 1944 - To Taiwan 1963, scrapped 1972
YTL 429 - 20-Oct- 1944 - To the Philippines 1963
YTL 430 - 944 - Sold 1970
YTL 431 - 1944 - Now a diving platform at PSNSY.
YTL 432 - 1944 - Sold 1972
YTL 433 - 1944 - To Cambodia 1973
YTL 434 - 1944 - Sold 1985 as Eugene H
YTL 550 - 1945 - To Korea 1986
YTL 551 - 1945 - Destroyed 1946
YTL 552 - 1945 - Sold 1946
YTL 553 - 1945 - Sold 1974
YTL 554 - 1945 - To the Philippines 1948
YTL 555 - 1945 - To Cambodia 1956
YTL 556 - 1945 - To France as Pingouin, to Cambodia 1956
YTL 557 - 1945 - Sold 1972
YTL 558 - 1945 - Scrapped 1980
YTL 559 - 1945 - To Paraguay 1963
YTL 560 - 1945 - Sold 1971
YTL 561 - 1945 - Sold 1946 as Ruby X, later Pi Ken, now Helen S.
YTL 562 - 1945 - Sold 1946 as Ruby XI, later Patricia S, now Meagan M
YTL 563 - 1945 - Sold 1946 as Ruby XII, later James B, Gregory H, scrapped 2017
YTL 564 - 1945 - Sold 1946 as Pol, later Ruby XIV, active
YTL 565 - 1945 - 
YTL 711 - 1945 - Sold 1947 as L C E, later Titan
YTL 712 - 1945 - Sold 1946 as Rescue
YTL 713 - 1945 - Sold 1946 as Margot Ann, later Margaret Ann, Ebey Island, Margaret Ann
YTL 714 - 1945 - Sold 1947 as Alert
YTL 715 - 1945 - Sold 1947 as Georgene M
YTL 716 - 1945 - Sold 1947 as Chenega, now Narada
YTL 717 - 1945 - Sold 1947 as Nellie Juan, now Carole B

District Harbor Tug Large (YTB)

District Harbor Tug Large (YTB) of the US Navy were 260 tons and 102 feet long. Powered by two Enterprise diesel engines at 1,270 horsepower.
Sabeata (YTB 287) - 4-Jun-1944 - Seattle in WW2,  Later YTM 763, sold 1972 as Retriever, later Glen Cove
Saguanash (YTB 288) - 26-Jul-1944 - Sunk 1946
Sakaweston (YTB 289) - 13-Sep-1944 - Seattle in WW2, Sold 1960 as Lummi Bay, later Lorna Foss 1969, Blackfish 1990, Rio Cuale 1991
Canokan (YTB 290) - 21-Oct-1944 - Sold 1958 as Canocan, later Sea King, Iver Foss, now yacht Tagish

Barracks Barge
Everett-Pacific's US Navy Barracks Barges was 1,300 tons and 261 feet long.  for use as a temporary barracks for sailors or other military personnel. A barracks ship may APL also were used as a receiving unit for sailors who need temporary residence prior to being assigned to their ship.
 APL 30 - 11-Apr-1945 - Scrapped 1975
 APL 31 - 14-Jun-1945 - Reefed off New Jersey 2001

Freight Barges (YFN)
Everett-Pacific YFN barges were 700 tons and 261 feet long. They were not self-propelled. A Navy class Type B ship.

YFN 718 - 24-Jan-1945 - Later YFNB 8, sold as JMC 24, scrapped 1995
YFN 719 - 22-Dec-1944 - Disposed of 1946
YFN 720 - 30-Jan-1945 - 
YFN 721 - 13-Jan-1945 -  
YFN 722 - 6-Feb-1945 -  
YFN 723 - Feb-1945 - Later YFNB 12, YDT 11, YRST 1, now YR 94
YFN 724 - Mar-1945 - Lost 1946
YFN 725 - Mar-1945 - Lost 1946

See also 
 :Category:Ships built by Everett-Pacific Shipbuilding & Dry Dock Company
 Seattle-Tacoma Shipbuilding Corporation#Shipbuilding in Puget Sound

References 

Construction and civil engineering companies of the United States
1869 establishments in California
Defunct shipbuilding companies of the United States
American companies established in 1942
Vehicle manufacturing companies established in 1942
1942 establishments in Washington (state)
Paccar
Shipbuilding in Washington (state)
Companies based in Everett, Washington